Mileanca is a commune in Botoșani County, Western Moldavia, Romania. It is composed of four villages: Codreni, Mileanca, Scutari and Seliștea.

References

Mileanca
Localities in Western Moldavia